Barbara Barnes  is an English actress.

Career

Television
 Dempsey and Makepeace, ITV mini-series 1 episode- Mary
 Miss Marple (A Caribbean Mystery), 1989, BBC TV mini-series 1 episode- Esther Walters
 Agatha Christie's Poirot Murder In Mesopotamia, ITV mini-series 1 episode- Mrs Leidner
 Agatha Christie's Poirot , ITV TV Series 1 episode- Mrs Lester
 Secrets and Words, 2012, BBC TV mini-series 1 episode- Brenda
 Rosamunde Pilcher, 2014, TV series 1 episode- Mayoress

References

English television actresses
Living people
Year of birth missing (living people)
20th-century English actresses
21st-century English actresses